Rio Mau e Arcos is a civil parish in the municipality of Vila do Conde, Portugal. It was formed in 2013 by the merger of the former parishes Rio Mau and Arcos. The population in 2011 was 2,681, in an area of 15.70 km².

References

Freguesias of Vila do Conde